The 1964–65 Copa México was the 50th edition of the Copa México and the 23rd staging in the professional era.

The competition started on 7 January 1965 and concluded on 7 March 1965 with the Final, held at the Estadio Olímpico Universitario in Mexico City, in which América defeated Morelia 4–0 to win the fourth cup title for the club.

Group stage

Group 1
<onlyinclude>

Group 2
<onlyinclude>

Group 3
<onlyinclude>

Group 4
<onlyinclude>

Knockout stage

Semifinals

|}

Final

Top goalscorers

References

Copa MX
1964–65 in Mexican football
1964–65 domestic association football cups